The Jinanqiao Dam or Jin'anqiao Dam (meaning "golden and peace bridge") is a concrete gravity dam on the Jinsha River  southeast of Lijiang City in Yunnan Province, China. The purpose of the dam is hydroelectric power production and flood control.

Construction
The Jinanqiao project was approved in August 2003 and construction began in 2005. By December of that year, the river was diverted and the construction of the actual dam began in January 2006. By February 2007, the foundation had been excavated and concrete pouring began. In June 2010, the dam's first generator was operational, the last was commissioned in 2011.

Design
Of the reservoir's storage,  is active or "useful". To prevent scouring, the dam has a stilling basin at the foot of the spillway. The dam's power station sits at its toe and adjacent to the spillway. Four penstocks with a  diameter feed the 4 x 600 MW Francis turbine-generators which can discharge up to  after generation. Each Francis runner has a  diameter.

Because of high seismic activity in the area of the dam, special care was taken during design and construction to prepare the joints and foundation for sliding and tensile stress. Earthquake-resistant steel bars were installed in high-tensile areas, the construction joint was reduced to 2/3 its size and filled with non-woven fabrics along with the incorporation of a grouted joint between the dam and power plant.

See also 

 List of power stations in China

References

Hydroelectric power stations in Yunnan
Dams in China
Dams on the Jinsha River
Gravity dams
Dams completed in 2010
Roller-compacted concrete dams
Energy infrastructure completed in 2011
2011 establishments in China
Buildings and structures in Lijiang